Robinstown (Tyrrell) is a townland in Mullingar civil parish in County Westmeath, Ireland. It is named for the Tyrrell baronets.

The Royal Canal passes through the townland, and the area is bordered by Culleen Beg to the east, Mullingar and Robinstown (Levinge) to the west.

References 

Townlands of County Westmeath